The Angel with the Trumpet (German: Der Engel mit der Posaune) is a 1948 Austrian historical drama film directed by Karl Hartl and starring Paula Wessely, Helene Thimig and Maria Schell. It is based on the novel of the same name by Ernst Lothar. The film was remade in Britain in 1950, under the same title.

It was shot at the Rosenhügel Studios in Vienna. The film's sets were designed by the art directors Otto Niedermoser and Walter Schmiedel.

Plot
Family Saga set in Vienna through the Late 19th Century to 1945 post-war period. Henriette Stein the daughter of a Jewish Academic has been having an affair with Crown Prince Rudolf, an affair she ends to marry Franz Alt Head of a Piano manufacturing firm, Her marriage takes place the same day as Crown Prince Rudolf's suicide in Mayerling who sents her a farewell note, years pass by and even with children now she's tempted by another man, what will she do? And especially what will become of her when the Nazis rise to power in Austria?

Cast
 Paula Wessely as Henriette Stein 
 Helene Thimig as Gretel Paskiewicz, geb. Alt 
 Hedwig Bleibtreu as Sophie Alt 
 Alma Seidler as Pauline Drauffen, geb. Alt 
 Maria Schell as Selma Rosner 
 Adrienne Gessner as Fürstin Pauline Metternich 
 Erni Mangold as Martha Monica Alt 
 Attila Hörbiger as Franz Alt 
 Paul Hörbiger as Otto Eberhard Alt 
 Hans Holt as Hans Alt 
 Oskar Werner as Hermann Alt 
 Fred Liewehr as Kronprinz Rudolf 
 Curd Jürgens as Graf Leopold Thraun 
 Anton Edthofer as Kaiser Franz Josef 
 Gustav Waldau as Simmerl 
 Karl Günther as Oberst Paskiewicz 
 Hermann Erhardt as Josef Drauffen 
 Alfred Neugebauer as Kriminalbeamter 
 Karl Paryla as Czerny 
 Karlheinz Böhm as Franz Alt jr.

References

Bibliography 
 Fritsche, Maria. Homemade Men in Postwar Austrian Cinema: Nationhood, Genre and Masculinity. Berghahn Books, 2013.

External links

1948 films
1940s German-language films
Films based on Austrian novels
Films set in Vienna
Films set in the 1880s
Films set in the 1890s
Films set in the 1900s
Films set in the 1910s
Films set in the 1920s
Films set in the 1930s
Austrian historical drama films
1940s historical drama films
Films shot at Rosenhügel Studios
Austrian black-and-white films
1948 drama films